Tony O. Wilt (born September 18, 1961) is an American politician. A Republican, he was elected to the Virginia House of Delegates in 2010. He  the 26th district, made up of the city of Harrisonburg and part of Rockingham County in the Shenandoah Valley.

Early life, education, business career
Born in Harrisonburg, Virginia, Wilt graduated from Broadway High School in 1979. He received an A.A. degree from Blue Ridge Community College in 1994, and a bachelor's degree in applied ministry from Cornerstone Bible College in 2005.

After high school, Wilt went to work for his family's business, Superior Concrete, Inc. He 

Wilt married Vickie Elizabeth Cook c. 1987. They have two children.

Political career
On March 16, 2010, Governor Bob McDonnell appointed the 26th district incumbent, Matt Lohr, Commissioner of the Virginia Department of Agriculture and Consumer Services. Wilt became the Republican nominee to succeed Lohr. He defeated Democrat Kai E. Degner and independent Carolyn W. Frank in a special election on June 15, receiving 65.79% of the vote. Wilt was unopposed for reelection in 2011.

In 2017, Wilt introduced HB2077, which has been labeled an "anti-public safety bill" by some. The bill would have allowed Virginians to bring weapons into emergency shelters during crisis situations. Then-Governor Terry McAuliffe stated that guns would have endangered vulnerable families and placed significant stress on staff and volunteers. (See also Gun laws in Virginia.)

Wilt voted against Medicaid expansion, HB5001, in the 2018 legislative session. The bill passed 68-30 in the House of Delegates with bipartisan support. Wilt voted against a bill to eliminate a law banning sexual intercourse before marriage in the 2020 legislative session. The bill passed 91-5 with bipartisan support in the house.

In 2022, Wilt was promoted to chair of the Public Safety Committee.

Notes

External links

1961 births
Living people
Republican Party members of the Virginia House of Delegates
People from Broadway, Virginia
People from Harrisonburg, Virginia
21st-century American politicians